This list of space technology awards is an index to articles about notable awards related to space technology.  This includes awards for development of spacecraft, satellites, space stations, and support infrastructure, equipment, and procedures.  The list shows the country of the sponsoring organization, but awards are not necessarily limited to people or organizations based in that country.

Awards

See also

 Lists of awards
 Lists of science and technology awards
 List of aviation awards
 List of astronomy awards
 List of challenge awards

References

Space-related